András Gergely or Geiger (20 January 1916 – 2008) was a Hungarian ice hockey player. He played for the Hungarian national team at the 1936 Winter Olympics and at several World Championships. His brother, László Gergely, was also an ice hockey player, and played with András at the Olympics.

References

External links
 
 
 
 
 

1916 births
2008 deaths
Ferencvárosi TC (ice hockey) players
Hungarian ice hockey left wingers
Ice hockey players at the 1936 Winter Olympics
Olympic ice hockey players of Hungary
Ice hockey people from Budapest
Hungarian emigrants to Chile